The 1946 Rabat Vickers Wellington crash was a military aviation accident that occurred in Malta on 5 April 1946 when a Vickers Wellington bomber crashed during a training exercise in a residential area in Rabat. All four crew members on board the aircraft and 16 civilians on the ground were killed. The crash also caused extensive property damage. The exact cause was never conclusively determined, but a magisterial inquiry suggested that leakage of hydraulic fluid leading to crew incapacitation could be a probable cause.

Background
The aircraft involved in the accident was a Vickers 440 Wellington B Mark X bomber with the registration HE274. The aircraft formed part of 765 Naval Air Squadron of the Fleet Air Arm of the Royal Navy, and it was the last Wellington in service with the Fleet Air Arm.

Accident
The Wellington took off from RAF Hal Far at 10.50am, after the crew had inspected the aircraft and declared it to be airworthy. The aircraft was taking part in a training exercise with a Supermarine Spitfire from No. 73 Squadron RAF, in which the Spitfire performed dummy attacks on the Wellington which was to take evasive action.

The two aircraft rendezvoused over Ħal Far at about 11.00am and established radio contact, before beginning the exercise by flying northwest towards Gozo. The Spitfire performed three attacks from above or at the same level as the Wellington, and then began its fourth attack from below.

All four crew members on board the aircraft died in the crash. On the ground, 16 residents were killed and several others were injured. Several children and a baby were among the dead.

Rescue and recovery efforts

The search and rescue operation was undertaken by British soldiers, naval ratings, RAF personnel, demolition and clearance rescue squads, medical officers, paramedics, police and firefighters. Fire engines and fire-fighting equipment was sent to the area from the Malta Dockyard and RAF Ta' Qali, while the navy supplied generators allowing the rescue efforts to continue at night.

Civilians also took part in searching for survivors, and police had to cordon off the crash site to prevent too many people from entering the area. The area was unsafe for the rescuers due to the unstable partially collapsed buildings and the spread of fire, and a policeman and a demolition crew member were injured by falling masonry. Clergymen also helped out in the recovery of bodies, and performed last rites to the victims.

At least 10 people were rescued alive from the rubble, and were taken to a hospital in Ħamrun.

Aftermath

The crash of the Wellington was the first air disaster to occur in Malta after the end of World War II. The crash site was visited by Lieutenant-Governor David Campbell, Archbishop Mikiel Gonzi, Vice-Admiral Frederick Dalrymple-Hamilton and the Commissioner of Police. Dalrymple-Hamilton offered condolences to the victims and their families, and the National Assembly observed a minute of silence on the recommendation of secretary R. G. Miller.

The crash resulted in extensive property damage which totaled up to about £11,000. 18 houses were destroyed or had to be evacuated after suffering severe damage, leaving 72 families homeless. These people were provided with new accommodation as well as clothes, food and other necessities after the crash.

Investigation
Representatives from the Surveyor of the Lands Department (H.M. Dockyard) inspected the crash site on the day after the disaster. A magisterial inquiry was conducted by Magistrate Albert Camilleri.

There were claims that smoke was seen coming from the aircraft before it crashed, but this contradicts the inquiry report which found no evidence of fire before the crash. There were also claims that the crew had attempted to land in fields below Tal-Virtù, but no distress calls were ever received from the aircraft.

The inquiry was unable to determine the exact cause of the crash, but leakage of hydraulic fluid was considered to be a probable cause. This could have resulted in fumes which rendered the crew unconscious, leaving them unable to control the aircraft.

See also
1952 Luqa Avro Lancaster crash
1975 Żabbar Avro Vulcan crash

Notes

References

Aviation accidents and incidents in Malta
Accidents and incidents involving military aircraft
Aviation accidents and incidents in 1946
Aviation accidents and incidents involving the Vickers Wellington
Fleet Air Arm
1946 in Malta
April 1946 events in Europe
1946
Aviation accidents and incidents caused by pilot incapacitation